The Hastings Tract is an island in the Sacramento–San Joaquin River Delta. It is part of Solano County, California, and managed by Reclamation District 2060.

References

Islands of Solano County, California
Islands of the Sacramento–San Joaquin River Delta
Islands of Suisun Bay
Islands of Northern California